These are the number-one singles on the Top 100 Singles chart in 1970 as published in Cashbox magazine.

See also 
1970 in music
List of Hot 100 number-one singles of 1970 (U.S.)

References
 
https://web.archive.org/web/20071011235443/http://members.aol.com/_ht_a/randypny3/cashbox/1970.html
https://web.archive.org/web/20080705030905/http://www.cashboxmagazine.com/archives/70s_files/1970.html
https://web.archive.org/web/20081106100047/http://musicseek.info/no1hits/1970.htm

1970
1970 record charts
1970 in American music